Howard DiSavino III (born April 10, 2001) is an American professional stock car racing driver. He last competed part-time in the NASCAR Xfinity Series, driving the No. 44 and 45 Chevrolet Camaros for Alpha Prime Racing.

Racing career
DiSavino became interested in racing when his parents obtained free tickets to an Arena Racing USA event near Richmond, Virginia when he was eight. When he was 13, DiSavino would begin arena racing and then race late models for the first time at age 15.

After competing in a CARS Late Model Stock Tour event at Dominion Raceway early in 2019, DiSavino III signed with Win-Tron Racing to make his debut in the ARCA Menards Series at Elko Speedway in July of that year. He would score a top-10 finish in his ARCA debut after qualifying twelfth. He ran one more race later in the year at IRP, where he crashed out and finished 16th.

It was announced on January 21, 2020, that DiSavino would return to Win-Tron to run a part-time schedule of ARCA races in their No. 32 again, along with making his Truck Series debut at the series' new race at Richmond Raceway, his home track. This would have marked Win-Tron's first time fielding a Truck Series team by themselves since 2015 when they fielded the No. 35 Toyota. The team had a presence in the series through partnerships with both SS-Green Light Racing and AM Racing in 2016 and 2017 and then again with Hill Motorsports in the season-opening Daytona race at the start of the season. No truck number was announced in the press release, although DiSavino's consultant (PMG Motorsports Management) and sponsor (Bud's Plumbing, Heating & Air Conditioning) posted images of his truck on Facebook, which had the No. 32 on it, Win-Tron's number in ARCA. The number belonged to Reaume Brothers Racing in 2019, but they dropped it for the 2020 season as a result of them switching one of their three trucks to the No. 00, opening the door for Win-Tron to pick up the number and use it for their restarted truck team with DiSavino III. However, due to the COVID-19 pandemic rescheduling the Richmond race to September, these plans were cancelled, and DiSavino only drove in ARCA that year.

In 2021, DiSavino III remained in the No. 32 ARCA car part-time, now a part of AM Racing after Win-Tron merged with that team, which competes full-time in the Truck Series with Austin Wayne Self. The two teams had an alliance for multiple years and shared a race shop starting in 2020. DiSavino made his first start at Daytona that year. On April 5, it was announced that DiSavino would get to make his Truck Series debut, which would still be at Richmond and with the same sponsors (Bud's as well as KEES Vacations), although it would instead be in the No. 3 for Jordan Anderson Racing, a team that is also housed in the AM Racing shop and has an alliance with them.

In 2022, he attempted the Richmond race with the No. 45 for Alpha Prime Racing but failed to qualify. However, he did qualify for the April Martinsville race, driving the No. 44 Chevy for the same team in which he failed to finish.

Motorsports career results

NASCAR
(key) (Bold – Pole position awarded by qualifying time. Italics – Pole position earned by points standings or practice time. * – Most laps led.)

Xfinity Series

Camping World Truck Series

ARCA Menards Series
(key) (Bold – Pole position awarded by qualifying time. Italics – Pole position earned by points standings or practice time. * – Most laps led.)

ARCA Menards Series West

References

External links
 
 

Living people
2001 births
People from Chesterfield, Virginia
Racing drivers from Virginia
NASCAR drivers
ARCA Menards Series drivers